= Coire =

Coire may refer to:

- Cirque, a terrain feature created by glaciation in high mountains
- Chur (French: Coire), a town in Switzerland
